Newport is a city and the county seat of Orleans County, Vermont, United States. As of the 2020 Census, the population was 4,455. The city contains the second-largest population of any municipality in the county (only neighboring Derby is larger), and has the smallest geographic area. It is the second-smallest city by population in Vermont. Newport is also the name of a neighboring town in Orleans County. 

Newport was founded by European Americans as a settlement in 1793 and was first called Pickeral Point. It was the place where Rogers' Rangers retreated to in 1759, during the French and Indian War (or Seven Years War between the French and British). 

In the 19th century, the village was stimulated by construction of the railroad in 1863, during the American Civil War. The lumbering firm Prouty & Miller operated here from 1865. Long after the post-war Reconstruction era, the village was the site for a Reunion Society of Vermont Officers in 1891. Newport has two public schools, one private school and a branch of the Community College of Vermont. As of the 2010 census there were 4,589 people.

History

Early 
In 1753, during the French and Indian War, an Abenaki band took English captive John Stark by canoe down Lake Memphremagog and came ashore at the site where the city of Newport later developed. Allies of the French during this war, they had captured Stark in a raid. They held him until his family and community raised a ransom. They then returned him to his home in New Hampshire. Given the warfare on the border with Canada, both sides took captives for ransom beginning in the late 17th century. Business was brisk at the time of Queen Anne and other English rulers.

Newport as a settlement was founded in 1793, after the American Revolutionary War. The village was first called Pickeral Point, but later renamed as Lake Bridge for its location at the head of Lake Memphremagog.

In 1816, part of the former town of Salem was annexed to the Town of Newport; it was absorbed into what was then a village. 

The railroad was constructed to Newport in 1863.  In 1868, the Lake Bridge settlement was incorporated as the Village of Newport. It became a busy lumber town. The lumbering firm of Prouty & Miller was started in 1865.

In 1932, during the Great Depression, the city operated a poor farm for the indigent, who worked for their board.

Transportation 
The Lady of the Lake steam excursion/ferry boat started operating in 1867. It stopped operations in 1917. This steamboat is used as Newport's logo.

In 1868, a livery stable started operating behind a hotel, several blocks from the railway station, which opened in 1863. At its peak, its owner kept 100 horses there.

By the late 19th century, the Boston & Maine and Central Vermont railroads were routed through Lake Bridge. The small village expanded because of increased connections to outside markets and ease of transportation; it attracted more residents. By the late 20th century, railroad passenger traffic had declined because people relied on individual vehicles; the last passenger train left Newport in 1965.

In 1917, the city paved Main Street. By the summer of 1930, traffic on the street had increased to 4,000 motor vehicles a day.

The city sold its airport to the state of Vermont in the 1970s.

Military 
Rogers' Rangers, a Vermont militia, were forced to retreat through the county following their attack on Saint-Francis, Quebec in 1759, during the French and Indian War. To confound their pursuers, they split up on the east shore of Lake Memphremagog. One group followed the Clyde River east. Another followed the Barton River south.

In the early 19th century, the women of pioneer Calvin Arnold's household refused to continue to live there. It was located near what is now Clyde Pond, and subject to raids by Indians.

During the American Civil War, the city had a scare when they received news of the St. Albans Raid. They thought these raids might repeat throughout the state, particularly at the south end of the lake. The militia was turned out. The ferry from Magog was met with determined-looking armed men, much to the captain's surprise, who had heard nothing about the raid. Armed Norwich University students were shipped in by train. Nothing happened and everyone was sent home after a few days.

In 1891, the American Civil War Reunion Society of Vermont Officers held its annual reunion in Newport.

In August 1942, a single-engine Royal Canadian Air Force (RCAF) training plane crashed into the lake near the west shore and the city, killing the pilot, the only occupant.

Architecture 

In 1873, the Bellevue Hotel was built to accommodate 75; later it expanded to hold 100 guests. It was renamed as the Newport House by 1891. It was demolished in 1973. The Memphremagog Hotel burned in 1907.

The Newport Wharf Light was a tower built on Lake Memphremagog in 1879. It has since been demolished.

The current county courthouse was built in 1886. That was the year that the legislature moved the shire town here. In 1879, the Field Opera House and Clock Tower was constructed. In 1896, it was destroyed by fire. The municipal building was later constructed at this site.

Lane's Opera House was constructed in 1892. It burned in 1923.

The Goodrich Memorial Library was built in 1899. The parochial Sacred Heart School was opened in 1904 as part of the Burlington Roman Catholic Diocese School District. It closed in the fall of 2007 because of falling enrollment.

In 1917, the city of Newport was formed from portions of the towns of Newport (former village of Newport) and Derby (former village of West Derby). It was organized on March 5, 1918. The four elementary schools were named after the section of the city they were in: East, West, and South schools.  Newport High was across from the West School. There were 60 businesses downtown; east, west and south had an additional 40 businesses.

The current federal courthouse was built in 1904. At the time, it included the United States post office, which has since relocated to a more modern facility.

The city was once divided into at least five neighborhoods: Chief-O, Stove-Pipe City, Skunk Hollow, French Village, and Batesville. Most of these names are not used in the 21st century. Batesville was the section around Prouty Bay. Skunk Hollow was in the valley west of Western Avenue.

Business 

The lumbering firm Prouty & Miller, started in 1865. It operated for more than 100 years, closing in the 1980s.

The Frost Veneer Mill, located on Prouty Bay, was once a primary employer in the Batesville neighborhood.

Between 1936 and 1953, the International Club in Newport had the largest dance floor in New England. . It could hold 2,000 dancers. Notable national performers entertained here while en route between the larger cities of Boston and Montreal, traveling on the Boston & Maine trains. They included: Louis Armstrong, Charlie Barnet, Les Brown, Cab Calloway, Rosemary Clooney, the Dorsey Brothers, Jimmy and Tommy; Stan Kenton, Kay Kyser, Gene Krupa, Glenn Miller, Tony Pastor, and Louis Prima.

In 2003, the Newport-headquartered Citizens Utility was sold. Its assets and operations were divided between Great Bay Hydro and Vermont Electric Cooperative. The Vermont Teddy Bear Company once had a plant within the city. A Columbia Forest Products plant employed about 100 workers. A local subsidiary of an international ski clothing manufacturer once employed 30 workers. It closed in 2011.

Geography
The city surrounds the southern shore of Lake Memphremagog. Three of the four major rivers in the county empty into the lake here: the Clyde, Barton, and the Black.

Newport borders the towns of Coventry to the south, Newport to the west, and Derby to the north and east.

Climate

Demographics

From its founding, Newport's population plateaued around 5,000 people until 1950 when it started dropping. It reached bottom in 1990 at 4,434. In 2010 the population dropped from the 2000 census, and it still had not reached its 1950 high which was 5,217. As of the census of 2010, there were 4,589 people, 2,086 households, and 1,191 families residing in the city. The population density was 830.0 people per square mile (320.5/km2). There were 2,342 housing units at an average density of 388.4 per square mile (150.0/km2). The racial makeup of the city was 96.14% White, 0.76% Black or African American, 0.62% Native American, 0.62% Asian, 0.22% from other races, and 1.64% from two or more races. Hispanic or Latino of any race were 1.28% of the population. Thirty-three percent were of French Canadian and French ancestry, 16% English, and 14% Irish.

There were 2,086 households, out of which 26.6% had children under the age of 18 living with them, 41.0% were married couples living together, 12.6% had a female householder with no husband present, and 42.9% were non-families. 35.5% of all households were made up of individuals, and 16.0% had someone living alone who was 65 years of age or older. The average household size was 2.20 and the average family size was 2.84.

In the city, the population was distributed by age with 22.2% under 18, 8.3% from 18 to 24, 27.1% from 25 to 44, 23.1% from 45 to 64, and 19.3% who were 65 years of age or older. The median age was 40 years. For every 100 females, there were 97.4 males. For every 100 females age 18 and over, there were 93.7 males.

In 2013, about 31% of adults in the area were obese. This was the highest in the state.

Economy

Personal income
In 2017, the median income for a household in the city was $34,000. The median income for the state was $53,700. The median income for a family was $34,922. Males had a median income of $33,810 versus $19,787 for females. The per capita income for the city was $20,054. About 13.0% of families and 18.2% of the population were below the poverty line, including 25.4% of those under age 18 and 5.4% of those age 65 or over.

The per capita income is the highest in Orleans County. The income ranks it 108 out of 282 census areas in Vermont.

Industry
Poulin Grain ships farm feed products to customers in New England and upstate New York. It employs about 50 workers. The plant produces feed 24 hours a day, seven days a week.

A Columbia Forest Products plant employs about 100 workers.

A call center employs 120 people.

MSA manufactures military combat helmets.

Health industry
North Country Hospital is the city's largest employer, employing 605 people.

Orleans-Essex Visiting Nurses Association and Hospice employs 100 people locally.

Northeast Kingdom Human Services serves people with mental health needs.

Social services are provided in part by the Northeast Kingdom Community Action, located here and in other Northeast Kingdom sites.

Tourism
A commercial ice fishing derby has been held in February since 2004. In 2010, there were 920 participants.

The only Soap Box Derby in Vermont is held in the city annually. The winner represents the state in the nationals.

The local Rotary has held an annual music festival involving county high schools since 1947.

Non-local government

The Northern State Correctional Facility, Newport Court, Reparative Services, and Vermont Correctional Industries are located in the city.

City government
Municipal offices are located in the former National Guard Armory, 222 Main Street, Newport.

Elected government consists of four aldermen with staggered two-year terms and a mayor.

The city has a paid staff for tax assessment/zoning administrator, public works department, police, fire, recreation and parks, city attorney, and harbor master.

There are decision-making boards which are filled by unpaid appointees: planning commission (5 people, three-year terms), harbor commission (5 people, two-year terms), development review board (nine people, three-year terms), and a recreation committee.

There are normal officers for Vermont cities and sometimes towns, except they are appointed for cities: Delinquent tax collector, town service officer, animal control, health officer, tree warden, weigher of coal, inspector of wood and shingles, representative to NVDA (Northeastern Vermont Development Association) board, representative to EDC board (Vermont Economic Development Authority), and Fence Viewers.

Budget (proposed 2014–2015) – $2.99 million. About $1 million is for the police force.

In 2017, the Grand List (total of taxable property) was $399 million. About 25% of this is non-taxable, belonging to government and religious entities.

Officials
The city is governed under the mayor-council system. In 2020, its mayor is Paul Monette. The council is composed of Dan Ross, Melissa Pettersson, Kevin Charbonneau and John Wilson. The city clerk/treasurer is James D. Johnson, and the city manager is Laura Dolgin.

Former mayors

Elections
Fifty-four percent of those registered voted in the 2008 general election. This was the lowest turnout in the county.

Education
Newport has two public schools: an elementary school, Newport City Elementary, and a high school, North Country Union High School. There is one private school, the United Christian Academy. In 1996 United Christian Academy was formed uniting Roman Catholic and Protestant churches in offering quality high school education. Elementary was later added following the closing of Sacred Heart School.

School districts

The city has a school board that governs the operation of Newport Elementary.

School Board directors include Leo Willey (chair), Corinna Lancaster (vice chair), Marcy Miller, Patrick Haugwitz, and Phil Laramie.

The budget for the Newport City Elementary School was $4,435,765 in 2007.

In addition, the city belongs to North Country Supervisory Union with members from nearby towns. They operate the North Country Union High School and the North Country Union Junior High School. The supervisor hired by this union board supervises the town school, as well as the union schools.

 Member, North Country Union High School Board – Tim DelaBruere (2010), Richard Cartee (2008) and James Privee (2009)

Higher education
Newport is home to a branch of the Community College of Vermont which enrolls nearly 300 students. It awards an Associate's Degree for these undergraduate studies.

Infrastructure

Transportation

Major routes

  U.S. Route 5 – connects the city with the town of Coventry to the south, and the town of Derby to the north and east
  VT Route 14 – connects the city with Coventry
  VT Route 100 – connects the city with the Town of Newport
  VT Route 105 – connects the city with the Town of Newport (concurrent with route 100), and the town of Derby (concurrent with route 5)
  VT Route 191 – "Access Road", connects I-91, Exit 27, to the city of Newport

U.S. Route 5 and VT Route 105 are concurrent through much of their routes through the city.

Interstate 91 is the nearest interstate highway, and runs through the neighboring town of Derby. Two exits (for VT Route 191 and for US 5/VT 105) provide access to Newport.

The city has six stoplights, which is most of the stoplights in the county. Five are on Route 5.

Major bridges
There are three major bridges over the South Bay of Lake Memphremagog, two of which connect two parts of the city, the former village of Newport with the former village of West Derby. Those two are the bridge on Route 5, and the "Long Bridge" connecting Route 5 to Mt. Vernon Street. Plans are underway to replace this latter bridge starting in 2012. It will cost about $5.26 million. The state will pay 90%; the city, the remainder.

The final bridge is the trestle for the railway.

Local community public and private transportation
RCT (Rural Community Transportation), a non-profit organization, runs out of Saint Johnsbury and services Caledonia, Essex, and Orleans counties. For general use, there are four buses north and south during the week from west Newport city to Derby, and two buses each way on Saturday. The fare is 25 cents.

Railroads
The city was once a junction for the Boston & Maine Railroad's Alouette and Red Wing trains splitting northwest to Montreal on the Canadian Pacific Railway and other Red Wing sections joining the New Haven Railroad's Connecticut Yankee and going directly north on Quebec Central Railway tracks to Sherbrooke, Quebec and Quebec City. Trains went south on Boston and Maine tracks towards New York City and on B&M tracks also towards Boston via Concord, New Hampshire. The Connecticut Yankee was the last strictly north–south international train, and it stopped going north across the border in the mid-1950s.

Washington County Railroad (known by the reporting mark WACR) – In 2007 WACR was awarded a 30-year contract by the State of Vermont to operate the rail line between White River Junction and Newport. Today the only regular service on this line is freight traffic.

Central Maine and Quebec Railway (known by the reporting mark CMQ) – The CMQ operates the line running northwest through North Troy and eventually on to Farnham, Quebec. It interchanges freight traffic with the WACR at Newport yard, just south of town.

The Massawippi Valley Railway line, which was part of the Quebec Central Railway, once ran east of Lake Memphremagog up to Lennoxville, Quebec, but it has been abandoned and the right-of-way has been converted into a mixed-use bicycle and walking path.

Airport
The city is served by the Northeast Kingdom International Airport. It contains two runways of  each 05–23, and 18–36.

Sewage

Media
 The Newport Daily Express – published daily except Saturdays and Sundays in Newport. Owned by Horizon Publications out of Marion, Illinois. Printed in Canada.
 Newport Dispatch – online-only news updated daily.

Notable people 

 Charles Francis Adams, first owner of the Boston Bruins
 Harry A. Black, Secretary of State of Vermont
 Reginald W. Buzzell, U.S. Army brigadier general, resided in Newport
 David M. Camp, Lieutenant Governor of Vermont, 1836–1841
 Walter H. Cleary, Chief Justice of the Vermont Supreme Court
 Rudolph J. Daley, Associate Justice of the Vermont Supreme Court
 Lane Dwinell, 69th Governor of New Hampshire
 Duane Graveline, astronaut
 Aaron H. Grout, son of Josiah Grout and Vermont Secretary of State
 Josiah Grout, 46th Governor of Vermont
 George H. Prouty, 52nd Governor of Vermont
 Winston L. Prouty, United States Senator
 William Weston, politician who served in the Vermont Senate, lived and worked in Newport

References

Further reading

External links

 City of Newport, Vermont – Official website
 

 
Populated places established in 1793
Cities in Vermont
County seats in Vermont
Cities in Orleans County, Vermont